"Varúð" (Icelandic for "Caution") is a song written and recorded by Icelandic post-rock band Sigur Rós for their sixth studio album, Valtari. It appears as the third track on the album. The song was released as the second official single from the album on August 21, 2012 on a 10" gramophone record in support of their then-current Sigur Rós World Tour.  It is also notably the first release by Sigur Rós under XL Recordings after the liquidation of EMI and the selling of its subsidiaries, including Sigur Rós' then-current label Parlophone. The song was used as a backing for an interpretive dance in the thirteenth season finale of It's Always Sunny in Philadelphia.

Track listing

Personnel
Sigur Rós
 Jón Þór Birgisson – vocals, guitar
 Georg Hólm – bass
 Kjartan Sveinsson – keyboard, piano
 Orri Páll Dýrason – drums

Charts

Release history

References

2012 singles
2012 songs
Sigur Rós songs
XL Recordings singles
Songs written by Jónsi
Songs written by Orri Páll Dýrason
Songs written by Georg Hólm
Songs written by Kjartan Sveinsson
Icelandic-language songs